Robert Wetherson Beattie (October 16, 1902June 3, 1983) was a professional American football player who played tackle in the American Football League (AFL) and the National Football League (NFL). He played for the AFL's Philadelphia Quakers (1926) and the NFL's New York Yankees (1927) and Orange/Newark Tornadoes (1929–1930).

1902 births
1983 deaths
Players of American football from New York City
American football tackles
Princeton Tigers football players
Philadelphia Quakers (AFL) players
New York Yankees (NFL) players
Orange Tornadoes players
Newark Tornadoes players